In Greek mythology, a drakaina is a female serpent or dragon, sometimes with humanlike features.

Mythology
Examples of the drakaina included Campe, Delphyne, Echidna and Sybaris.

Python, slain by Apollo, and the earliest representations of Delphyne are shown as simply gigantic serpents, similar to other Greek dragons. However, although the word "drakaina" is literally the feminine form of drakon (Ancient Greek for dragon or serpent), most drakainas had some features of a human woman. Lamia, Campe, Echidna, and many representations of Ceto, Scylla, and Delphyne had the head and torso of a woman. Medusa is also mentioned as a drakaina while also emphasizing her human aspects; rather than a drakaina alone, it has been argued that she is a woman who has been fused with a dragon.  

The drakaina was a sacred female spirit dragon generally slain only by gods or demigods.  Zeus slew Delphyne and Campe, Apollo slew Python, and Argus Panoptes slew Echidna.

Echidna was the mate of Typhon and the mother of a huge brood of monsters, including other dragon-like creatures. According to Hesiod, Echidna gave birth to Cerberus, Orthrus, the Chimera, the Nemean lion, the Sphinx, and the Hydra. Other ancient authors, such as Hyginus, attribute even more monsters as children of Echidna such as the Caucasian eagle, the Crommyonian Sow, the Colchian dragon, the Harpies and Scylla.)

References

External links
 Theoi.com page on Echidna
 Theoi.com page on various types of Greek dragons; describes Drakaina

Greek dragons
Female legendary creatures
Legendary serpents